Taquaritinga is a city in the Central North area of the State of São Paulo, Brazil. The population is 57,364 (2020 est.) in an area of 594 km². The population is formed basically by European descendants (Italians, Spaniards, and Portuguese). Afro-Brazilians, and Japanese-Brazilians are important minority groups.

The climate is tropical of altitude with dry mild winter and hot rainy summer. The economy of the city is based in agrobusiness (sugarcane, orange, lemon, and fruits) and services. The city has an old and regionally famous music school (Conservatório Santa Cecília), an ETEC (Technical School), and three colleges. The most important of them, FATEC, is a public one with courses on technology. Clube Atlético Taquaritinga, founded in 1942, is the football club of the city. The club plays its home matches at Estádio Adail N. da Silva, which has a maximum capacity of approximately 20,000 people.

Notable people
Taquaritinga was the birthplace of:
 Augusto Nunes (b. 1949): journalist
 Edmílson José Gomes de Morais (b. 1976): footballer, 2002 FIFA World Cup champion
 José Paulo Paes (b. July 22, 1926 - d. October 9, 1998) was a poet, translator, literary critic and essayist.
 Luiz Araújo (b. 1996): footballer for Atlanta United

References